Oannes spinosus is a species of leaf-footed bug known from South Africa.

References

Coreini